Yitzhak Ben-Hezekiah Yosef Kovo (1770–1854) was born in the large Sephardi community of Ottoman Salonica and later settled in Ottoman-era Jerusalem. In 1848 he succeeded Chaim Abraham Gagin as hacham bashi aged 78. Throughout his career he went on fundraising missions to Poland, London and Egypt. In 1854, while in Alexandria, he died. He authored many works on the Mishnah, Talmud and Shulchan Aruch and wrote responsa.

Sources
 
 Gaon, M.D. (1938) Yehudei ha-Mizrach be-Eretz Yisrael, Vol. 2, pg. 623–626.

Rabbis from Thessaloniki
19th-century rabbis from the Ottoman Empire
Sephardi rabbis in Ottoman Palestine
1770 births
1854 deaths